KHEW 88.5 FM is a Community radio station, owned and operated by the Chippewa Cree Tribe of the Rocky Boy's Reservation. The station is licensed to the Rocky Boy's Reservation in Montana.

See also
List of community radio stations in the United States

References

External links

Community radio stations in the United States
Native American radio
HEW
Ojibwe culture